iTunes Sessions are a series of live albums and extended plays (EP) recorded by various artists and released exclusively through the iTunes Store, and are a companion series to iTunes Originals.

Bands who have recorded EPs and some existing articles:

Yeah Yeah Yeahs, Jan 1, 2006
Diplo, Jul 2, 2007
Supergrass, Aug 29, 2008
Colbie Caillat, Jan 1, 2009
Kate Voegele, Jan 1, 2009
Blind Pilot, Dec 29, 2009
Taio Cruz, Jan 1, 2010
Gin Wigmore, Jan 1, 2010
The Mumlers, Jan 19, 2010
YACHT, Feb 9, 2010
Fanfarlo, Feb 12, 2010
Billy Talent, Feb 16, 2010
Lykke Li, Feb 28, 2010
suzumoku, Mar 24, 2010
iTunes Session (Shinedown), Apr 6, 2010
Joshua James, Jun 15, 2010
Angel Taylor, Jul 20, 2010
iTunes Session (Lady Antebellum), Aug 17, 2010
Beach House, Aug 24, 2010
Switchfoot, Aug 30, 2010
Diane Birch, Sep 1, 2010
Train (band), Sep 7, 2010
a flood of circle, Sep 8, 2010
Black Rebel Motorcycle Club, Sep 14, 2010
Angus & Julia Stone, Sep 28, 2010
Great Lake Swimmers, Sep 28, 2010
Brad, Oct 5, 2010
The Black Keys, Oct 19, 2010
Great Big Sea, Oct 19, 2010
iTunes Session (Gorillaz), Oct 22, 2010
Ozomatli, Nov 2, 2010
Skillet, Nov 12, 2010
Edward Sharpe & The Magnetic Zeros, Nov 30, 2010
Vampire Weekend, Dec 21, 2010
Karkwa, Dec 21, 2010
Grace Potter and The Nocturnals, Jan 1, 2011
PJ Harvey, Jan 1, 2011
Metric, Jan 4, 2011
Matt Mays, Jan 11, 2011
Winter Gloves, Feb 22, 2011
Shad, Mar 1, 2011
Natalie Merchant, Mar 10, 2011
Cobra Starship, Aug 23, 2011
Papa vs Pretty, Oct 28, 2011
The Wailin' Jennys, Nov 1, 2011
Gavin DeGraw, Nov 18, 2011
iTunes Session (Kelly Clarkson), Dec 23, 2011
Elizaveta, Jan 1, 2012
Wilco, Jan 20,2012
Mayer Hawthorne, Jan 1, 2012
Ryan Adams, Apr 24, 2012
B.o.B, May 1, 2012
Passenger (singer), Jun 29, 2012
Mat Kearney, Aug 3, 2012
First Aid Kit, Sep 11, 2012
Dispatch, Dec 4, 2012
iTunes Session (Matt Corby), released in December, 2012
fun., Dec 10, 2012
Tenth Avenue North, Dec 14, 2012
iTunes Session - EP (Imagine Dragons), Jan 1, 2013
Ellie Goulding, Jan 1, 2013
Phillip Phillips, Jan 1, 2013
Zedd, Jan 1, 2013
Bahamas (musician), Jan 1, 2013
Frank Turner, Jan 1, 2013
Ben l'Oncle Soul, Jan 1, 2013
Alabama Shakes, Feb 5, 2013
Lights, Apr 2, 2013
Gary Clark Jr., Apr 5, 2013
alt-J, Apr 16, 2013
Jimmy Eat World, Jul 22, 2013
Joey Yung, Aug 6, 2013
Skylar Grey, Oct 15, 2013
Hannah Georgas, Oct 22, 2013
Local Natives, Nov 5, 2013
Walk off the Earth, Nov 22, 2013
My Morning Jacket, Dec 6, 2013
Third Day, Dec 13, 2013
Florida Georgia Line, Jan 14, 2014
José González, Mar 1, 2014
Basia Bulat, Mar 18, 2014
Mumiy Troll, Mar 24, 2014
Basta, Apr 14, 2014
Caetano Veloso, Apr 24, 2014
Lindi Ortega, Jun 17, 2014
iTunes Session (Live) (Jessica Mauboy), Jul 18, 2014
JJ Lin, Jul 18, 2014
OneRepublic, Jul 22, 2014
Pakho Chau, Sep 2, 2014
Teesy, Oct 3, 2014
iTunes Session (Chet Faker), Nov 28, 2014
Fat Freddy's Drop, Dec 9, 2014
Shiga Lin, Dec 16, 2014
Neil Finn, Feb 6, 2015
Christine and the Queens, Feb 9, 2015
Adam Tas, Feb 13, 2015
Li Ronghao, Feb 17, 2015
Matthew Mole, Mar 2, 2015
Ayaka, Mar 16, 2015
Kodaline, Jun 26, 2015
The Weepies, May 5, 2017

References